Arkady Renko (Russian: Аркадий Ренко) is a fictional detective who is the central character of nine novels by the American writer Martin Cruz Smith.

Character timeline
In Gorky Park, the first novel, he is a chief investigator for the Soviet Militsiya in Moscow, where he is in charge of homicide investigations. In the sequels, he takes on roles varying from a militiaman to a worker on a fish processing ship in the arctic.

Born into the nomenklatura, Arkady is the son of Red Army General Kiril Renko, an unrepentant Stalinist also known as "the Butcher", who sees Arkady as a bitter failure for choosing the simple life of a policeman over a military career, or even a career in the Communist Party. Arkady was also never able to forgive himself for indirectly and unwittingly helping his mother commit suicide (he helped her gather the rocks she used to drown herself with in the lake at their family estate when he was a young boy). Wary of the official lies of Soviet society, Arkady exposes corruption and dishonesty on the part of influential and well-protected members of the elite, regardless of the consequences. When exposed to Western capitalist society, he finds it to be equally corrupt and returns to the Soviet Union. Despite this, and his own tough nature, he emerges as a man capable of displaying both compassion and a faith in the future.

The first three books published between 1981 and 1992 form a trilogy culminating with the fall of the Soviet Union, at the August Coup in 1991. The action in Gorky Park takes place in the Soviet Union and in the US, Polar Star on board a Soviet fishing vessel in the Bering Sea, and Red Square in West Germany and the Glasnost-era Soviet Russia. Havana Bay is set in Cuba; Wolves Eat Dogs is set in Moscow and in the areas affected by the Chernobyl disaster. Stalin's Ghost, published in 2007, returns Arkady to a Russia now presided over by Vladimir Putin, followed by Three Stations published in 2010, Tatiana in 2013, The Siberian Dilemma in 2019, and Independence Square in 2023.

The Arkady Renko novels
(with years of publication)

Gorky Park (1981)
Polar Star (1989)
Red Square (1992)
Havana Bay (1999)
Wolves Eat Dogs (2004)
Stalin's Ghost (2007)
Three Stations (2010)
Tatiana (2013)
The Siberian Dilemma (2019)
Independence Square (2023

Film
In 1983 Gorky Park was adapted as a film starring William Hurt as Renko.

See also

Gorky Park, a 1983 film based on the first novel
 Child 44 with Leo Demidov

References

External links
 Martin Cruz Smith official site

 
Characters in American novels of the 20th century
Characters in American novels of the 21st century
Literary characters introduced in 1981
Fictional Russian people in literature
Fictional Soviet people
Fictional Russian police detectives
Fictional police detectives
Thriller film characters